Daniel Musovski (born November 30, 1995) is an American professional soccer player who plays as a winger for Real Salt Lake in Major League Soccer.

Career

College 
Prior to starting college, Musovski was named the Nevada Gatorade Player of the Year as a high school junior, and set the state high school record for single-season goals as a senior at 58. At UNLV, he played four years of college soccer, from 2014 to 2017, during which he scored 47 goals in 88 appearances. He was a two-time All-America selection, and as a senior earned WAC Offensive Player of the Year honors.

Musovski made seven appearances for PDL side Burlingame Dragons FC in 2016 and scored six goals.

Professional
On January 10, 2018, Musovski was selected 30th overall by the San Jose Earthquakes during the 2018 MLS SuperDraft. He was signed by the club on March 1, 2018, and immediately loaned to San Jose's USL affiliate, Reno 1868 FC, alongside fellow SuperDraft pick Mohamed Thiaw. Musovski made his professional debut as a second-half substitute for Chris Wehan in Reno's 4–3 loss to Swope Park Rangers on March 17, 2018. He scored his first professional goal in his second appearance on March 24, 2018, in a 1–1 draw with Las Vegas Lights FC, a match from which he was later ejected. Musovski was released by San Jose at the end of their 2018 season.

Musovski joined Reno 1868 permanently on January 17, 2019, following his release by San Jose.

On December 10, 2019, Musovski joined Major League Soccer side Los Angeles FC ahead of the 2020 season. He made his debut for the club on July 13, 2020, against Houston in the MLS is Back Tournament as a substitute for Adama Diomande in the 79th minute. On September 2, 2020, Musovski scored his first goal with LAFC in a 5-1 win over San Jose. On October 11, 2020, Musovski scored a brace in a 3-1 win over the Seattle Sounders.

Musovski scored his first goal while on loan to USL Championship side Las Vegas Lights FC in a 3-1 loss to Sacramento Republic FC in the 2021 USL Championship season.

On August 3, 2022, Musovski was traded to Real Salt Lake in exchange for $250,000 in General Allocation Money.

Personal life
Born in the United States, Musovski is of Macedonian descent.

Career statistics

Club

Honors
Collegiate
 NSCAA National Player of the Week (November 18, 2014)
 2014 WAC All-Tournament
 2014 WAC Tournament MVP
 2015 NSCAA 2nd Team All-American
 2015 TopDrawerSoccer Best XI Third Team
 2015 College Soccer News 3rd Team All-American
 2015 NSCAA All-West Region First Team
 2015 WAC Offensive Player of the Year
 2015 All-WAC First Team
 2016 MAC Hermann Trophy Watch List
 2016 All-WAC First Team
 2016 WAC All-Tournament
 2016 WAC Tournament MVP
 2016 NSCAA All-West Region Second Team
 TopDrawerSoccer National Player of the Week (November 15, 2016)

References

External links

UNLV bio

1995 births
Living people
American soccer players
American people of Macedonian descent
Association football forwards
Burlingame Dragons FC players
Las Vegas Lights FC players
Las Vegas Mobsters players
Los Angeles FC players
Major League Soccer players
People from Henderson, Nevada
Real Salt Lake players
Reno 1868 FC players
San Jose Earthquakes draft picks
San Jose Earthquakes players
Soccer players from Nevada
Sportspeople from the Las Vegas Valley
FC Tucson players
USL Championship players
UNLV Rebels men's soccer players
USL League Two players